The Pocket Cube (also known as the 2×2×2 Rubik's Cube or Mini Cube) is a 2×2×2 version of the Rubik's Cube. The cube consists of 8 pieces, all corners.

History

In March 1970, Larry D. Nichols invented a 2×2×2 "Puzzle with Pieces Rotatable in Groups" and filed a Canadian patent application for it. Nichols's cube was held together with magnets. Nichols was granted  on April 11, 1972, two years before Rubik invented his Cube.

Nichols assigned his patent to his employer Moleculon Research Corp., which sued Ideal in 1982. In 1984, Ideal lost the patent infringement suit and appealed. In 1986, the appeals court affirmed the judgment that Rubik's 2×2×2 Pocket Cube infringed Nichols's patent, but overturned the judgment on Rubik's 3×3×3 Cube.

Permutations

Any permutation of the eight corners is possible (8! positions), and seven of them can be independently rotated (37 positions). There is nothing identifying the orientation of the cube in space, reducing the positions by a factor of 24. This is because all 24 possible positions and orientations of the first corner are equivalent due to the lack of fixed centers (similar to what happens in circular permutations). This factor does not appear when calculating the permutations of N×N×N cubes where N is odd, since those puzzles have fixed centers which identify the cube's spatial orientation. The number of possible positions of the cube is

The maximum number of turns required to solve the cube is up to 11 half or quarter turns, or up to 14 quarter turns only.

The number a of positions that require n any (half or quarter) turns and number q of positions that require n quarter turns only are:

The two-generator subgroup (the number of positions generated just by rotations of two adjacent faces) is of order 29,160.

Code that generates these results can be found here.

Methods
A pocket cube can be solved with the same methods as a 3x3x3 Rubik's cube, simply by treating it as a 3x3x3 with solved (invisible) centers and edges. More advanced methods combine multiple steps and require more algorithms. These algorithms designed for solving a 2×2×2 cube are often significantly shorter and faster than the algorithms one would use for solving a 3×3×3 cube.

The Ortega method, also called the Varasano method, is an intermediate method. First a face is built (but the pieces may be permuted incorrectly), then the last layer is oriented (OLL) and lastly both layers are permuted (PBL). The Ortega method requires a total of 12 algorithms.

The CLL method first builds a layer (with correct permutation) and then solves the second layer in one step by using one of 42 algorithms. A more advanced version of CLL is the TCLL Method also known as Twisty CLL. One layer is built with correct permutation similarly to normal CLL, however one corner piece can be incorrectly oriented. The rest of the cube is solved, and the incorrect corner orientated in one step. There are 83 cases for TCLL. Algorithms have been generated for solving all of them.

The most advanced method is the EG method.  It also starts by building a layer (in any permutation), but then solves the rest of the puzzle in one step. It requires knowing 128 algorithms, 42 of which are the CLL algorithms.

Top-level speedcubers may also 1-look the puzzle,
 
which involves inspecting the entire cube and planning as much of the solution as possible before starting the solve by predicting where the pieces will go after finishing a side.

Notation
Notation is based on 3×3×3 notation but some moves are redundant (All moves are 90°, moves ending with ‘2’ are 180° turns):

R represents a clockwise turn of the right face of the cube
U represents a clockwise turn of the top face of the cube
F represents a clockwise turn of the front face of the cube
R' represents an anti-clockwise turn of the right face of the cube
U' represents an anti-clockwise turn of the top face of the cube
F' represents an anti-clockwise turn of the front face of the cube

World records 
The world record fastest solve is Guanbo Wang China solving it in 0.47 seconds at the on 30 November 2022 at Northside Spring Saturday 2022 in Brisbane, Australia.

The world record average of 5 solves (excluding fastest and slowest) is 1.01 seconds, set by Zayn Khanani of The United States on 22 January 2023 at Pioneer Valley Cubing B 2023, with the times 0.91, 0.97, (0.71), 1.16 and (2.91) seconds.

Top 5 solvers by single solve

Top 5 solvers by average of 5 solves

See also
 Rubik's Cube (3×3×3)
 Rubik's Revenge (4×4×4)
 Professor's Cube (5×5×5)
 V-Cube 6 (6×6×6)
 V-Cube 7 (7×7×7)
 V-Cube 8 (8×8×8)
 Combination puzzle

References

External links 
Methods for speedsolving the 2×2×2
code for enumerating all permutations of a Rubik's cube

Rubik's Cube